A. Clark Forney (February 25, 1871 – April 11, 1956) was the 14th Lieutenant Governor of South Dakota from 1925 to 1927 serving under Governor Carl Gunderson. He was a member of the Republican Party.

Biography
Forney was born in Holt County, Missouri, and came to South Dakota in 1889, settling at Hill City. He was a veteran of the Spanish–American War. He went into the farming and stock raising business at Oelrichs and was treasurer of Fall River County, South Dakota in 1905-1909. He was a United States Commissioner from 1907 to 1917, and served in the state senate of the South Dakota Legislature from 1921 to 1925. He was elected lieutenant governor in 1924.

Notes

1871 births
1956 deaths
People from Holt County, Missouri
People from Fall River County, South Dakota
Lieutenant Governors of South Dakota
South Dakota state senators
People from Hill City, South Dakota